Chuckie Williams (born December 31, 1953) is an American former professional basketball player.

Life 
A  guard, Williams played at Kansas State University from 1972 to 1976 for head coach Jack Hartman. One of the school's most potent long-range shooters, Williams was a four-year letterman from 1972–76. He helped lead the Wildcats to an 82–30 (.732) record, including two NCAA Elite Eight appearances and the 1973 Big Eight regular-season championship. Ironically, he spanned the years between his fellow retirees and was a teammate of both Mike Evans and Lon Kruger.

After averaging just 5.3 points as a sophomore, Williams made one of the biggest scoring jumps in school history the following season as he paced the Wildcats in scoring at 22.1 points per game en route to guiding K-State to the 1975 Elite Eight.  He was named first team All-Big Eight and a Helms Foundation All-American.  The following year, Williams guided the squad to its second consecutive 20-win season en route to earning second team All-America honors from The Sporting News, Converse Yearbook and Basketball Weekly. He also repeated his first-team All-Big Eight honors as well as Helms Foundation All-America accolade.

A native of Columbus, Ohio, Williams still ranks among the top 10 in 24 single-game, season or career statistical categories in school history, including tops in field goals made in a game (22), field goals attempted in a game (42), season field goals made (290) and season field goal attempts (594). He is also the school's sixth all-time leading scorer with 1,364 points.

Williams held the school single-game scoring mark for 19 years with 47 points against Holy Cross in 1975 before Askia Jones broke the mark with 62 against Fresno State on March 24, 1994. He also shares the mark for most points in an NCAA Tournament game with 35 against Syracuse in 1975. For his career, Williams averaged 16.2 points on 47.0 percent shooting with 2.7 rebounds in 84 games.

Williams became just the second player in school history to be selected in the first round of the 1976 NBA draft when he was picked 15th by the Cleveland Cavaliers. He played 22 games for Cleveland in 1976–77, averaging 1.7 points per game.  An injury to Williams' back in his first professional year ended his career.

References

1953 births
Living people
African-American basketball players
American men's basketball players
Basketball players from Columbus, Ohio
Cleveland Cavaliers draft picks
Cleveland Cavaliers players
Kansas State Wildcats men's basketball players
Parade High School All-Americans (boys' basketball)
Shooting guards
21st-century African-American people
20th-century African-American sportspeople